
This article gives an overview of Australian Aboriginal kinship groupings within Western Australia, with the tribal boundaries based on Norman Tindale's 1974 map, as published in Western Australia: An Atlas of Human Endeavour (1979) by the Government of Western Australia.

 Noongar - occupying the area of the South West Agricultural Division of Western Australia - affected from 1827 onwards, and today represented by the South West Aboriginal Land and Sea Council. It includes five cultural groups:
 Perth Type: Matrilineal moieties and totemic clans.  Patrilineal local descent groups.  Includes Amangu, Yued, Whadjuk, Binjareb, Wardandi, Ganeang and Wilmen.
 Nyakinyaki Type: Alternate generational levels similar to Western Desert type, with patrilineal local descent groups.  Includes Balardong and Nyakinyaki.
 Bibelmen type: Patrilineal moieties and patrilineal local descent groups.  Includes Bibulmen and Minang.
 Wudjari type: similar to Nyakinyaki except they have named patrilineal totemic local descent groups.
 Nyunga type: similar to Wangai with two endogamous named divisions (Bee-eater and King fisher), in which marriage took place within one's own division but children were in the opposite, modified from the Western Desert system.  Includes Nyunga.

 Yamatji - occupying the Murchison, Gascoyne- affected from the 1840s onwards, represented today by the Yamatji Bana Baaba Marlpa Land and Sea Council.

 Nganda type: Patrilineal totemic local descent groups, no moieties or sections.  Includes Nganda and Nandu.
 Inggadi-Badimaia gtype: Sections not well defined, Patrilineal totemic local clans grouped into larger divisions.  Includes Inggada, Dadei, Malgada, Ngugan, Widi, Badimaia, Wadjari, and Goara.
 Djalenji-Maia type: Sections correlated with kin terms, Matrilineal descent groups.  Includes Noala, Djalenji, Yinigudira, Baiyungu, Maia, Malgaru, Dargari, Buduna, Guwari, Warianga, Djiwali, Djururu, Nyanu, Bandjima, Inawongga, Gurama, Binigura and Guwari.
 Nyangamada type: Sections with indirect matrilineal descent, with patrilineal local descent groups.  Includes Bailgu, Indjibandji, Mardudunera, Yaburara, Ngaluma, Gareira, Nyamal, Ngala, and Nyangamada.

 Wankai or Wongi - occupying the Goldfields and Nullarbor regions of Western Australia affected from the 1880s onwards, represented today by the Goldfields Land and Sea Aboriginal Council Corporation.
 Galamaia-Gelago type: Like Nyunga, but practising circumcision.  Includes Galamaia, Ngurlu, Maduwongga, and Gelago.
 Mirning Type: Patrilineal local totemic descent groups, No moieties or sections.  Similar to the Western Desert type.  Includes Ngadjunmaia, Mirning.

 Kimberley peoples - in the Kimberley region - speaking a variety of languages and affected from the 1870s onwards, represented today by the Kimberley Land Council.

 Garadjeri type: As for Nyangamada.  Includes Garadjeri, Mangala, Yaoro, Djungun, Ngombal, Djaberadjabera, and Nyulnyul.
 Bardi type. Patrilineal local descent groups, no moieties or sections. Includes Warwar, Nimanburu, Ongarang, Djaul Djaui.
 Ungarinyin type: Patrilineal. Includes Umedi, Wungemi, Worora, Wunumbul

 Ngaanyatjarra - occupying the Central Desert region - and being much less affected than the other Aboriginal groups of Western Australia.

See also
 Aboriginal history of Western Australia
Timeline of Aboriginal history of Western Australia

References

Further reading
 Bates, Daisy (1985) The native tribes of Western Australia (edited by Isobel White). Canberra : National Library of Australia. 
 Davidson, Daniel Sutherland, (1938) An ethnic map of Australia Philadelphia : American Philosophical Society. p. 649-679 Reprint of Philadelphia : Proceedings of the American Philosophical Society, Vol. 79, no. 4, 1938. and A preliminary register of Australian tribes and hordes, by D.S. Davidson. Philadelphia (Pa.), 1938. Published by the American Philosophical Society.
Douglas, Wilfrid H. The Aboriginal Languages of the South-West of Australia, Canberra: Australian Institute of Aboriginal Studies, 1976. 
Green, Neville, Broken spears: Aborigines and Europeans in the Southwest of Australia, Perth: Focus Focus Education Services, 1984. 
Haebich, Anna, For Their Own Good: Aborigines and Government in the South West of Western Australia 1900 - 1940, Nedlands: University of Western Australia Press, 1992. . 
 Tindale, Norman B. (1974) ''Aboriginal tribes of Australia : their terrain, environmental controls, distribution, limits, and proper names  (with an appendix on Tasmanian tribes by Rhys Jones). Canberra : Australian National University Press.

External links
 (Creative Commons Attribution 3.0 Australia licence)

History of Western Australia